was a Japanese actor and tarento who was the first Taisō no Onīsan. He was born in Tokyo. His wife was actress and voice actress Nobuyo Ōyama.

Biography
While attending Seijo High School, he appeared in numerous socialist films such as Ashizuri Misaki. After graduation he entered Eguchi Dance Institute and was taught modern dance and the fundamentals of acting.

In 1961 he became prominent Uta no Ehon as the first generation "Taisō no Onīsan". In 1964 he married co-star Nobuyo Ōyama.

As a successor to Yukio Aoshima and Kokontei Shinba VIII in Ohiru no Wide Show, he served as a presenter in various fields including six years from 1980. He appeared on the stage of Fuji Theater in 1985 and since then he was active in actors and lecture activities.

In 1988, co-authored with Nobuyo, he wrote the cookbook Keisuke-Nobuyo no Omoshiro Sōzai 170 which upgraded from a housewife company and became a bestseller of more than one million copies, and in 1991 they wrote the sequel Keisuke-Nobuyo no Omoshiro Shukō.

In 2001, he wrote Kamisan wa Doraemon from Futabasha, who wrote about the daughter who is fighting cancer and the days of the sand river who care for it. In 2013, Sagawa also announced that he had rejected early stomach cancer but was not treat anticancer drug.

To the 5 May 2009, he appeared in NHK Educational TV's 50th anniversary commemorative special program ETV50: Kodomo no Hi Special -Do Mitai Kyōiku TV Dai 2-dan- (Namahōsō) Okaasan to Issho as the first generation "Taisō no Onīsan", for the first time in about 40 years in costume and showed exercise gymnastics with the song "Genki ni Ichi, Ni".

On 15 May 2015, Sagawa announced that Nobuyo was suffering from dementia and he was taking care of her.

He died at the age of 80 from kidney cancer on 11 July 2017.

Filmography

Television

Radio

Stage

Films

Discography

Bibliography

References

External links
 

Japanese television personalities
Japanese male actors
Japanese television presenters
People from Tokyo
1937 births
2017 deaths